Casley is a surname. Notable people with the surname include:

Leonard Casley (1925–2019), founder of the Principality of Hutt River
Jack Casley (1926–2014), English footballer
Graeme Casley (born 1957), second and final monarch of Hutt River

See also
Casey (surname)